Coiled-coil domain-containing protein 6 is a protein that in humans is encoded by the CCDC6 gene.

Interactions 

CCDC6 has been shown to interact with PPP4C.

References

External links

Further reading